Francisco Bojórquez Mungaray (born 2 August 1935) is a Mexican politician affiliated with the Institutional Revolutionary Party. He served as Senator of the LIX Legislature of the Mexican Congress representing Sonora as replacement of Eduardo Bours, and previously served in the Congress of Sonora.

References

1935 births
Living people
Politicians from Sonora
Members of the Senate of the Republic (Mexico)
Members of the Congress of Sonora
Institutional Revolutionary Party politicians
20th-century Mexican politicians
21st-century Mexican politicians
People from Moctezuma, Sonora